Royal Air Force Dunholme Lodge or more simply RAF Dunholme Lodge was a Royal Air Force station located between the parishes of Welton and Dunholme in Lincolnshire, England.

History
The grass airfield was first used by the Royal Air Force during 1941 and 1942 for use by Handley Page Hampden aircraft from nearby RAF Scampton, and was officially opened as a RAF Station in September 1942 as part of RAF Bomber Command with the building of three hard runways.

The main occupier of the station was 44 Squadron, with the Avro Lancaster four-engined heavy bomber, which moved in from RAF Waddington in May 1943 and stayed until it moved to RAF Spilsby in September 1944.

In November 1944 flying operations ceased due to the proximity of other stations which did not allow night flying. At the end of the war 120 Lancasters had been lost on operations from Dunholme Lodge.

From 1948 the site was host to motorcycle and car racing until 1959 when the base was reopened as an active RAF station.

The William Farr School was opened in 1952 on part of the disused domestic site.

On re-opening in 1959, the airfield became a site for Bristol Bloodhound surface-to-air missiles with 141 Squadron until it was disbanded and the station finally closed in 1964.

Based units

The following units were also here at some point:
 Detachment of No. 14 (Pilots) Advanced Flying Unit RAF (April 1942)
 No. 1485 (Bomber) Gunnery Flight RAF (August – October 1942)
 No. 1518 (Beam Approach Training) Flight RAF
 No. 2799 Squadron RAF Regiment, a Light Anti-Aircraft squadron.
 Air Bomber Training Flight, No. 5 Group (August – October 1942)
 General Aircraft Limited

Current use
Bits of the runways still exist and the site is now used for farming.

References

Citations

Bibliography

External links

 Official History
 RAF Dunholme Lodge from the IBCC Digital Archive at the University of Lincoln.

Royal Air Force stations in Lincolnshire
Royal Air Force stations of World War II in the United Kingdom